Graham Elliot Bowles (born January 4, 1977) is an American chef, restaurateur, and reality television personality. He first gained recognition in the restaurant business as a three-time nominee for the James Beard Award. In 2004, he was named to Food & Wine "Best New Chefs" list, and became the youngest chef in the United States to receive four stars from a major publication (Chicago Tribune, Chicago Sun-Times).

Among television viewers, he gained fame as a contestant on the programs Iron Chef and Top Chef Masters, and as a judge on the first six seasons of the American MasterChef and its spinoff, MasterChef Junior.

Early life
Graham Elliot Bowles was born in Seattle, Washington. A self-described "Navy brat", Elliot has traveled the world and all fifty states, sparking an intense interest in food and music, which led him to attend Johnson & Wales University.

Career
In 2004, Elliot was named to Food & Wine "Best New Chefs" list, and he became the youngest chef in the States to receive four stars from a major publication (Chicago Tribune, Chicago Sun-Times) before the age of 30.

At the age of 27 he was the youngest four-star chef to be named in any city, also earning himself a spot on Crain's Chicago Business list of "40 Under Forty", alongside President Barack Obama, for whom Elliot cooked on the President's 49th birthday.

In May 2008, he opened his eponymous restaurant, which was the first French casual fine dining restaurant in Chicago.

In 2009, Elliot  appeared on the TV show Top Chef Masters. In the show, he cooked for The Heart and Stroke Foundation, a charity with which he became associated as a result of his nephew's  need for a heart transplant.

In 2010, the series MasterChef premiered, with Elliot as one of the three judges. In 2013, the series spun off a child version of the program, MasterChef Junior, on which Elliot also was featured as a judge. He left the franchise in September 2015, following the completion of season 6 of the parent program.

In 2016, he became a judge on Top Chef.

Awards and honors
Graham Elliot Restaurant received three stars from the Chicago Tribune, and two stars in the 2013 Michelin Guide.

He has been nominated for a James Beard Award three times.

Collaborations and marketing
In addition to being judge and host of MasterChef and MasterChef Junior from 2010 to 2016, Graham has also been a judge on Food Network's Cooks vs. Cons hosted by Geoffrey Zakarian. He also appeared as a special guest in MasterChef Canada Season 2, Episode 9 and MasterChef Italia Season 3, Episode 9.

He has worked as the Culinary Director at Lollapalooza, a three-day music festival in Chicago, every year since 2009, where he has cooked for both the public as well as backstage for the performers. 

In June 2012, he opened Graham Elliot Bistro in Chicago's West Loop. The bistro uses traditional techniques and ingredients to showcase its take on classic American cuisine. That same year, Elliot was named Chef of the Year and inducted into the Chicago Chefs Hall of Fame. Additionally, Chicago Mayor Rahm Emanuel proclaimed September 19 "Graham Elliot Day" in the city of Chicago.

In 2017, Elliot was in an infomercial for the Gotham Steel Double Grill.

Personal life
Elliot resided in Morgan Park on the south side of Chicago with wife/business partner and his three children.

Elliot sings and plays guitar. He also collects baseball cards.

References

1977 births
Chefs from Chicago
American male chefs
American restaurateurs
Businesspeople from Seattle
Johnson & Wales University alumni
Living people
Judges in American reality television series
Chefs from Seattle